State Highway 210 (SH 210) is a proposed state highway in the U.S. state of Texas that runs from I-610 on the western side of Houston to downtown near Union Station. It was designated on September 29, 1992.

History
SH 210 was designated on July 16, 1934 from Fairfield to SH 14 at Wortham. On February 11, 1937 this route was cancelled as it was never built, and became FM 27 in 1942.

References

210
Proposed state highways in the United States
Roads in Houston